Ludu may refer to:

People
 Ludu Daw Amar (1915–2008), Burmese dissident writer and journalist
 Ludu Sein Win (1940–2012), Burmese writer, journalist, and teacher
 Ludu U Hla (1910–1982), Burmese journalist, publisher, chronicler, folklorist and social reformer, husband of Ludu Daw Amar
 Remus Ludu (1914–1982), Romanian gymnast

Places
 Lüdu, a county in Jiyin Commandery in ancient China
 Ludu, a village in Ponoarele Commune, Mehedinți County, Romania